The Action Blue Sky Campaign is an environmental campaign in Hong Kong, organised by the Environmental Protection Department, to clean up the city's air pollution.  It was officially launched by Chief Executive Donald Tsang on July 25, 2006.  According to a press release of the Hong Kong government, its campaign slogan in Chinese is "全城投入　為藍天打氣" (All of the city participate to fight for a blue sky), while its campaign slogan in English is "Clean Air for a Cool Hong Kong!"  The campaign hopes to win support from the public as well as the business community, including those businesses investing in the Pearl River Delta Region.

Public service announcements
The Action Blue Sky Campaign features two 30-second public service announcements on television and radio.  Dr. Sarah Liao, Secretary for the Environment, Transport and Works, appears in the public service announcements, speaking about regional co-operation to fight air pollution, and how each individual can help improve air quality.  These public service announcements were first previewed at the launch ceremony of the campaign.

Planned activities
Many activities are planned to push the environmental goals of the Action Blue Sky Campaign, including:
Beginning in August 2006, exhibitions with quiz booths are set up in 18 districts, educating the public about air pollution.
The Advisory Committee on the Environment will be holding a workshop in September, inviting green groups and academics to discuss and review objectives to improve air quality.
The Environmental Campaign Committee will be working with District Councils and green groups to reinforce green messages to the public, encouraging people to take various measures to save energy and improve air quality.
The Environmental Campaign Committee will also be giving out the Hong Kong Eco-business Award in September.  It is hoped that the Eco-business Award will compel the business community to take an active role in improving air quality.  A seminar will also be held in November 2006 to showcase best environmental practices for the business community.
A number of initiatives involving schools will be held to educate students on air pollution issues and encourage them to improve air quality.  The Hong Kong Green School Awards and the Hong Kong Green Pre-School Awards will be given in September.  The Student Environmental Protection Ambassadors Scheme will be launched in October 2006 to promote green messages at schools.  School-based competitions are to be organised to educate students about air pollution.

See also

Air pollution
Environmental organisation
Lights Out Hong Kong

References

External links
Action Blue Sky Campaign information from the Environmental Protection Department
Action Blue Sky Campaign blog
Press release on the launching of the Action Blue Sky Campaign

Air pollution organizations
Environmental organisations based in Hong Kong
2006 in Hong Kong